Kendal Edmund O'Brien (1849 – 21 November 1909) was an Irish nationalist politician and Member of Parliament (MP) in the House of Commons of the United Kingdom of Great Britain and Ireland.

He represented the Irish Parliamentary Party the for Mid Tipperary constituency, from 1900 until his death in office in November 1909.

External links

 

1849 births
1909 deaths
Members of the Parliament of the United Kingdom for County Tipperary constituencies (1801–1922)
Irish Parliamentary Party MPs
UK MPs 1900–1906
UK MPs 1906–1910